The 1992 CFL Draft composed of eight rounds where 64 Canadian football players were chosen from eligible Canadian universities and Canadian players playing in the NCAA.

1st round

2nd round

3rd round

4th round

5th round

6th round

7th round

8th round

References
Canadian Draft

Canadian College Draft
Cfl Draft, 1992